In mathematics, list edge-coloring is a type of graph coloring that combines list coloring and edge coloring.
An instance of a list edge-coloring problem consists of a graph together with a list of allowed colors for each edge. A list edge-coloring is a choice of a color for each edge, from its list of allowed colors; a coloring is proper if no two adjacent edges receive the same color.

A graph G is k-edge-choosable if every instance of list edge-coloring that has G as its underlying graph and that provides at least k allowed colors for each edge of G has a proper coloring.
The edge choosability, or list edge colorability, list edge chromatic number, or list chromatic index, ch′(G) of graph G is the least number k such that G is k-edge-choosable. It is conjectured that it always equals the chromatic index.

Properties
Some properties of ch′(G):
 ch′(G) < 2 χ′(G).
 ch′(Kn,n) = n.
 ch′(G) < (1 + o(1))χ′(G), i.e. the list chromatic index and the chromatic index agree asymptotically .
Here χ′(G) is the chromatic index of G; and Kn,n, the complete bipartite graph with equal partite sets.

List coloring conjecture
The most famous open problem about list edge-coloring is probably the list coloring conjecture.

ch′(G) = χ′(G).

This conjecture has a fuzzy origin;  overview its history.

References 

 .
 .
 

Graph coloring